A sexuality related phobia is a hatred, dislike of, or a negative attitude towards, a particular type of sexual behavior or people who are identified as or perceived to be members of that group. Sexuality-related phobias refer to reactions ranging from antipathy to contempt, prejudice, aversion, irrational fear, and even hatred.

Aphobia – Dislike or prejudice against asexuality or asexual people.
Biphobia –  Dislike or prejudice against bisexuality or bisexuals.
Homophobia –  Dislike or prejudice against homosexuality or homosexuals.
Lesbiphobia –  Dislike or prejudice against lesbians.
Transphobia – Dislike or prejudice against transgender people.
Heterophobia –  Dislike, prejudice or resentment of heterosexuals or heterosexuality.

Sexual emotions